Hyvärinen is a Finnish surname. Notable people with the surname include:

Antti Hyvärinen (1932–2000), Finnish ski jumper
Eero Hyvärinen (1890–1973), Finnish gymnast
Mikko Hyvärinen (1889–1973), Finnish gymnast
Pasi Hyvärinen (born 1987), Finnish volleyball player
Perttu Hyvärinen (born 1991), Finnish cross-country skier
Toni Hyvärinen (born 1988), Finnish ice hockey player

See also
Annemari Sandell-Hyvärinen (born 1977), Finnish long-distance runner

Finnish-language surnames